Vrouwenvoetbal Alkmaar, commonly known as VV Alkmaar, is a Dutch football (soccer) club that competes in the Eredivisie, the top women's league in the Netherlands. The club is the only one in the league not affiliated with a men's professional club.

History
From 2007 until 2011 AZ Alkmaar had a successful women's section, but when they decided to pull the plug on the women's team for financial reasons, most of the players moved to nearby Telstar, who were starting up a women's section. The team continued to train in Alkmaar and because the offices were there as well. It was decided after the 2016–17 season  to separate from Telstar, move to Alkmaar and form a new club.

Players

Current squad

Broadcasting
As of the 2020–21 season, league matches played on Sunday are broadcast on Fox Sports. Public service broadcaster NOS occasionally broadcasts some Sunday games live and provides game highlights during the Studio Sport programme.

References

External links
 
 

Eredivisie (women) teams
2017 establishments in the Netherlands
Women's football clubs in the Netherlands
Football clubs in Alkmaar
Association football clubs established in 2017